Katerina Stewart was the defending champion, but lost in the first round to Ann Li.

Catherine Bellis won the title, defeating Marta Kostyuk in final after she retired at 6–4, 6–7(4–7), 0–0.

Seeds

Draw

Finals

Top half

Bottom half

References

Main Draw

Mercer Tennis Classic - Singles